Nuwa (minor planet designation: 150 Nuwa) is a large main-belt asteroid with an orbital period of . It was discovered by Canadian-American astronomer James Craig Watson on October 18, 1875, and named after Nüwa, the Chinese creator goddess. This object is a candidate member of the Hecuba group of asteroids that orbit near the 2:1 mean-motion resonance with Jupiter. Based upon the spectrum it is classified as a C-type asteroid, which indicates that it is probably composed of primitive carbonaceous chondritic material and the surface is exceedingly dark.

Photometric observations of this asteroid at the Catania Astrophysical Observatory during 1992 and 1993 gave a light curve with a period of 8.140 ± 0.005 hours. In 2004, an additional photometric study was performed at Swilken Brae Observatory in St Andrews, Fife, yielding a probable period of 8.1364 ± 0.0008 hours and a brightness variation of 0.26 ± 0.03 in magnitude. A 2011 study from Organ Mesa Observatory in Las Cruces, New Mexico gave a period of 8.1347 ± 0.0001 hours with a brightness variation of 0.17 ± 0.02 magnitude, which is consistent with prior results.

On December 17, 1999, a star was occulted by Nuwa.

References

External links
Image taken on September 25, 26, 27 2009 from Slooh Robotic Telescope (Teide - Canary Islands): 
Image taken on October 3, 2009 from Slooh Robotic Telescope (Teide - Canary Islands):
Image taken on October 23, 2009 from Slooh Robotic Telescope (Teide - Canary Islands): 
 
 

000150
000150
000150
Discoveries by James Craig Watson
Named minor planets
000150
18751018